Stocksville is an unincorporated community in Buncombe County, North Carolina, United States,  located at the intersection of Old Mars Hill Highway (SR 2207) and Murphy Hill Road (SR 2134), near the I-26/US 19/US 23 interchange (exit 17).  North Buncombe High School is located nearby.

References

Unincorporated communities in Buncombe County, North Carolina
Unincorporated communities in North Carolina